İkizler is a village in the Şirvan District of Siirt Province in Turkey. The village is populated by Kurds of the Silokan tribe and had a population of 380 in 2021.

The hamlets of Nergiz and Saçayak are attached to İkizler.

References 

Kurdish settlements in Siirt Province
Villages in Şirvan District